The Sixtieth Anniversary Celebrations of King Bhumibol Adulyadej's Accession to the Throne were the celebrations held throughout Thailand in 2006 to celebrate King Bhumibol Adulyadej's 60 years on the throne. The celebrations were arranged by the Royal Thai Government with Thaksin Shinawatra as Prime Minister, and joined by representatives of other monarchies.

Official emblem 

King Bhumibol selected one of twelve designs presented by the Fine Arts Department of the Ministry of Culture to be the official emblem for the celebrations. The emblem selected was designed by department artist Somchai Supphalakamphaiphon.

There are several symbols in the emblem. The centerpiece is a cypher of the king's name in golden yellow, the colour of Monday, his day of birth. The cypher is set on a blue background, which is a royal colour. The device is encircled with diamonds, which symbolise wise men, important authors, craftsmen, the sacred white elephant, graceful women, vigorous soldiers, and public servants.

The Royal Regalia that circumscribe the device: the Great Crown of Victory surmounts the throne, flanked by a sword and a yak's tail whisk; under the throne is a pair of royal slippers. These five objects are used in coronation ceremonies, which were last used during the king's coronation on 5 May 1950.

The bottom of the emblem features a pink ribbon with the name of the celebrations inscribed in gold. The two ends of the ribbon are held by the monkey god Hanuman, the devotee and leader of Rama's army in the Ramakien, and Garuda, the Hindu god Vishnu's vehicle. The green and gold colors in the background represent the fertility of the land.

Main programmes

Royal ceremonies 
The king endorsed the royal programmes during the periods of June 2006 as follows:

The royal ceremonies were broadcast in their entirety nationwide by The Television Pool of Thailand through every general television channel at the dates and times listed.

State ceremonies 

 Lighting of Well-Wishing Candles Ceremony, Friday, 9 June 2006, 19:19, Sanam Luang.
 Feasting Assemblage arranged by the Government to offer the dinner to the monarchs, the Government House.
 Trooping the Colour, Thanon Ratchadamnoen.

Visiting royalty 

Of the 29 reigning monarchs worldwide in 2006, 25 accepted the Royal Thai Government's invitation to join the celebrations in Thailand: 13 sovereigns were themselves in attendance, while 12 sent representatives. Absent were the now-deposed Gyanendra of Nepal, owing to his country's internal political instability and Abdullah of Saudi Arabia, owing to ill health.

Heads of state and consorts

Royal representatives

Commemorations 

Thais wore royal yellow tee shirts to celebrate (although in some organisations it became mandatory), and as the main celebration period of 9–13 June approached, shirts bearing the celebrations' special emblem rapidly sold out. The Ministry of Commerce ordered another 500,000 shirts to meet demand, and many people still wore yellow shirts weeks after the celebrations ended.

Also popular were orange rubber wristbands, similar to the Livestrong wristbands, inscribed "We love the King."

Photographs of the ceremonies are also popular. The Bureau of the Royal Household set up a photo lab specifically to fill orders for official images, and on Bangkok's streets there are vendors selling copies of the photos of the king and visiting royals. Also, newspapers such as the Bangkok Post and The Nation reported brisk sales of commemorative publications.

See also
 Thailand
 Diamond Jubilee of Elizabeth II
 Diamond Jubilee
 List of longest-reigning monarchs

References

External links
Palaces of the King – Galleries of images by Royal Household photographers
A Visionary Monarch – provides a lot of insights on his visions and contributions to the country.

Chakri dynasty
Bhumibol Adulyadej
Thai monarchy
Ceremonies in Thailand
Anniversaries
2006 in Thailand
June 2006 events in Asia